Mark J. Johnson (born May 2, 1975) is a former Major League Baseball pitcher. He is currently the pitching coach for the Erie SeaWolves.

Career
A native of Dayton, Ohio, Johnson attended Springboro High School and the University of Hawaii. In 1994, he played collegiate summer baseball with the Brewster Whitecaps of the Cape Cod Baseball League.

Johnson was drafted by the Astros in the first round (19th overall) of the 1996 MLB draft. After the 1997 season, he was traded to the Florida Marlins traded Johnson, Manuel Barrios and Oscar Henriquez for Moisés Alou. In February 1999, the Marlins traded Johnson with Ed Yarnall and Todd Noel to the New York Yankees for Mike Lowell.

After the 1999 season, the Detroit Tigers chose Johnson in the Rule 5 draft. They released him in June.

Coaching career
On March 18, 2022, Johnson was hired to serve as the pitching coach for the Lancaster Barnstormers of the Atlantic League of Professional Baseball.

References

External links

Pura Pelota (VPBL stats)

1975 births
Living people
Baseball coaches from Ohio
Baseball players from Dayton, Ohio
Brewster Whitecaps players
Detroit Tigers players
Erie SeaWolves players
Gulf Coast Yankees players
Hawaii Rainbow Warriors baseball players
Indianapolis Indians players
Kissimmee Cobras players
Las Vegas 51s players
Leones del Caracas players
American expatriate baseball players in Venezuela
Major League Baseball pitchers
Minor league baseball coaches
Norwich Navigators players
Portland Sea Dogs players
Tampa Yankees players
Toledo Mud Hens players
University of Hawaiʻi at Mānoa alumni